St. Anthony's Hospital may refer to:

 St. Anthony's Hospital (Columbus, Ohio), formerly in Columbus, Ohio
 Saint Anthony's Hospital (Morrilton, Arkansas), listed on the NRHP in Arkansas
 St. Anthony's Hospital Annex, Las Vegas, New Mexico, listed on the NRHP in New Mexico
 St. Anthony's Hospital (St. Petersburg, Florida)
 St Anthony's Hospital, North Cheam, London Borough of Sutton
 St. Anthony's Hospital, St Benet Fink, a mediaeval hospital in the City of London

See also
St. Anthony Hospital (disambiguation)
St. Anthony's Hospital Heliport
St. Anthony's Hospital fire